Frano may refer to:

 Frånö, a village in Sweden
 Frano (given name), a Croatian masculine name